The AVC qualification for the 2010 FIVB Women's Volleyball World Championship saw member nations compete for four places at the finals in Japan.

Draw
13 of the 65 AVC national teams entered qualification. (Solomon Islands and Maldives later withdrew) The teams were distributed according to their position in the FIVB Senior Women's Rankings as of 5 January 2008 using the serpentine system for their distribution. (Rankings shown in brackets) Teams ranked 1–2 did not compete in the second round, and automatically qualified for the third round.

First round

Second round

Third round

First round

Pool A
Venue:  Te Rauparaha Arena, Porirua, New Zealand
Dates: April 20–24, 2009
All times are New Zealand Standard Time (UTC+12:00)

|}

|}

Second round

Pool B
Venue:  The Sports Palace, Oskemen, Kazakhstan
Dates: June 16–18, 2009
All times are Almaty Time (UTC+06:00)

|}

|}

Pool C
Venue:  Nakhon Pathom Sport Center, Nakhon Pathom, Thailand
Dates: June 12–14, 2009
All times are Indochina Time (UTC+07:00)

|}

|}

Third round

Pool D
Venue:  Sichuan Provincial Gymnasium, Chengdu, China
Dates: July 3–5, 2009
All times are China Standard Time (UTC+08:00)

|}

|}

Pool E
Venue:  Municipal Gymnasium, Chiayi, Taiwan
Dates: August 28–30, 2009
All times are Chungyuan Standard Time (UTC+08:00)

|}

|}

References

External links
 2010 World Championship Qualification

2010 FIVB Volleyball Women's World Championship
2009 in volleyball
FIVB Volleyball World Championship qualification